American writer C. J. Cherryh career began with publication of her first books in 1976, Gate of Ivrel and Brothers of Earth. She has been a prolific science fiction and fantasy author since then, publishing over 80 novels,  short-story compilations, with continuing production as her blog attests. Cherryh has received the Hugo and Locus Awards for some of her novels.

Her novels are divided into various spheres, focusing mostly around the Alliance–Union universe, the Foreigner series and her fantasy novels.

The Alliance–Union universe

The Alliance–Union universe is a science fiction future history series, in which the development of political entities and cultures occurs over a long time period. Major characters in one work may be referenced or appear briefly in another.

The Company Wars

According to the author, the novels in this universe, except Heavy Time and Hellburner (which were subsequently re-published in one volume as Devil to the Belt), can be read in any order. Those two books are chronologically the earliest in the series.

 Downbelow Station (1981) – Hugo Award winner, Locus Award nominee, 1982
 Merchanter's Luck (1982)
 also published in the Alliance Space (2008) omnibus
 Rimrunners (1989) – Locus Award nominee, 1990
 Heavy Time (1991)
 Hellburner (1992)
 Devil to the Belt (2000) – single-volume edition of the above two books
 Tripoint (1994)
 Finity's End (1997) – Locus Award nominee, 1998

The Hinder Stars
 Alliance Rising (2019) (credited to C. J. Cherryh and Jane S. Fancher) – Prometheus Award winner 2020
 Alliance Unbound (January 2024)

The Era of Rapprochement
 Serpent's Reach (1980)
 Also published in The Deep Beyond (2005) omnibus
 Forty Thousand in Gehenna (1983)
 Also published in the Alliance Space (2008) omnibus
 The Scapegoat (1985) – novella
 Cyteen (1988) – Hugo Award and Locus Award winner, British Science Fiction Award nominee, 1989
 Also published in a three-volume edition as The Betrayal, The Rebirth and The Vindication, about which Cherryh has written, "There was a paperbound publication that split the novel into three parts, but this has ended: the current and, by my wishes, all future publications, will have Cyteen as one unified book."
 Regenesis (2009)

The Chanur novels

 The Pride of Chanur (1981) – Hugo Award and Locus Award nominee, 1983
 Chanur's Venture (1984) – Locus Award nominee, 1985
 The Kif Strike Back (1985)
 The Chanur Saga (2000) – single-volume edition of the above three books
 Chanur's Homecoming (1986)
 Chanur's Legacy (1992)
 Chanur's Endgame (2007) – single-volume edition of the above two books

The Mri Wars

 The Faded Sun: Kesrith (1978) – Hugo Award and Locus Award nominee, 1979; Nebula Award nominee, 1978 
 The Faded Sun: Shon'Jir (1978)
 The Faded Sun: Kutath (1979)
 The Faded Sun Trilogy (UK, 1987 and US, 2000) – single-volume edition of the above three books

Merovingen Nights (Mri Wars Period)

 Angel with the Sword (1985)
 Merovingen Nights – shared world series of anthologies (see "As Editor" below)

The Age of Exploration
These novels share a common theme, but are unrelated to each other and can be read in any order.
 Port Eternity (1982)
 also published in the Alternate Realities (2000) omnibus
 Voyager in Night (1984) – Philip K. Dick Award nominee, 1984 
 also published in the Alternate Realities (2000) omnibus
 Cuckoo's Egg (1985) – Hugo Award nominee, 1986
 also published in The Deep Beyond (2005) omnibus

The Hanan Rebellion
 Brothers of Earth (1976)
 Hunter of Worlds (1977)
 At the Edge of Space (2003) – single-volume edition of the above two books

Miscellaneous
 Wave Without a Shore (1981)
 also published in the Alternate realities (2000) omnibus

The Foreigner series

Trilogy arc 1
 Foreigner (1994) – Locus SF Award nominee, 1995
 Invader (1995) – Locus SF Award nominee, 1996
 Inheritor (1996)
Trilogy arc 2
 Precursor (1999)
 Defender (2001) – Locus SF Award nominee, 2002
 Explorer (2003)
Trilogy arc 3
 Destroyer (2005)
 Pretender (2006)
 Deliverer (2007)
Trilogy arc 4
 Conspirator (2009)
 Deceiver (2010)
 Betrayer (2011)
Trilogy arc 5
 Intruder (2012)
 Protector (2013)
 Peacemaker (2014)
Trilogy arc 6
 Tracker (2015)
 Visitor (2016) – Locus SF Award nominee, 2017
 Convergence (2017)
Trilogy arc 7
 Emergence (2018)
 Resurgence (2020)
 Divergence (2020)
Trilogy arc 8
 Defiance (scheduled October 17, 2023)

Other science fiction

Finisterre universe

 Rider at the Gate (1995)
 Cloud's Rider (1996)

Gene Wars
 Hammerfall (2001) – John W. Campbell Award nominee, 2002
 Forge of Heaven (2004)

Miscellaneous
 "Cassandra" (1978) –  short story, Hugo Award winner, 1979
 Hestia (1979)

Fantasy works

The Morgaine Cycle

 Gate of Ivrel (1976)
 Well of Shiuan (1978)
 Fires of Azeroth (1979)
 Above three collected in the following editions:
The Book of Morgaine (1979)
The Chronicles of Morgaine (1985)
The Morgaine Saga (2000)
 Exile's Gate (1988)

The Fortress series

 Fortress in the Eye of Time (1995) – Locus Fantasy Award nominee, 1996
 Fortress of Eagles (1998) – Locus Fantasy Award nominee, 1999
 Fortress of Owls (1999) – Locus Fantasy Award nominee, 2000
 Fortress of Dragons (2000)
 Fortress of Ice (2006)

Ealdwood

 Ealdwood (1981 novella)
 The Dreamstone (1983 novel) – includes material from Cherryh's short story "The Dreamstone" (1979) and the novella Ealdwood 
 The Tree of Swords and Jewels (1983 novel)
 Arafel's Saga (1983) – single-volume edition of The Dreamstone (1983) and The Tree of Swords and Jewels (1983)
 Ealdwood (1991) – single-volume edition of The Dreamstone (1983) and The Tree of Swords and Jewels (1983) with revisions and a new ending
 The Dreaming Tree (1997) – single-volume edition of The Dreamstone (1983) and The Tree of Swords and Jewels (1983) with the Ealdwood (1991) revisions

The Russian stories

 Rusalka (1989) – Locus Fantasy Award nominee, 1990
 Rusalka (2010) – revised ebook edition
 Chernevog (1990)
 Chernevog (2012) – revised ebook edition (credited to C. J. Cherryh and Jane Fancher)
 Yvgenie (1991)
 Yvgenie (2012) – revised ebook edition

Heroes in Hell

 The Gates of Hell (1986), novel with Janet Morris
 Kings in Hell (1986), novel with Janet Morris
 Legions of Hell (1987)

Miscellaneous fantasy
 The Brothers (1986) – novella
 The Paladin (1988) – Locus Fantasy Award nominee, 1989
 The Goblin Mirror (1992)
 Faery in Shadow (1993)
 Faery Moon (2009) – revised ebook edition of Faery in Shadow, plus its prequel, "The Brothers"
 Lois & Clark: A Superman Novel (1996)

Collections

Omnibuses
The Book of Morgaine (1979) – Gate of Ivrel (1976), Well of Shiuan (1978) and Fires of Azeroth (1979)
Arafel's Saga (1983) – The Dreamstone (1983) and The Tree of Swords and Jewels (1983)
The Chronicles of Morgaine (1985) – Gate of Ivrel (1976), Well of Shiuan (1978) and Fires of Azeroth (1979)
Ealdwood (1991) – The Dreamstone (1983) and The Tree of Swords and Jewels (1983) with revisions and a new ending
The Dreaming Tree (1997) – The Dreamstone (1983) and The Tree of Swords and Jewels (1983) with revisions and a new ending
The Morgaine Saga (2000) – Gate of Ivrel (1976), Well of Shiuan (1978) and Fires of Azeroth (1979)
The Faded Sun Trilogy (2000) – Kesrith (1978), Shon'Jir (1978) and Kutath (1979)
The Chanur Saga (2000) – The Pride of Chanur (1981), Chanur's Venture (1984) and The Kif Strike Back (1985)
Devil to the Belt (2000) – Heavy Time (1991) and Hellburner (1992)
Alternate Realities (2000) – Wave Without a Shore (1981), Port Eternity (1982) and Voyager in Night (1984)
At the Edge of Space (2003) – Brothers of Earth (1976) and Hunter of Worlds (1977)
The Deep Beyond (2005) – Serpent's Reach (1980) and Cuckoo's Egg (1985)
Chanur's Endgame (2007) – Chanur's Homecoming (1986) and Chanur's Legacy (1992)
Alliance Space (2008) – Merchanter's Luck (1982) and Forty Thousand in Gehenna (1983)

Short fiction
 Sunfall (1981) – short stories and novelettes
 Visible Light (1986) – short stories, novelettes and novellas
 Glass and Amber (1987) – short stories and essays
 The Collected Short Fiction of C. J. Cherryh (2004) – short stories, novelettes and novellas, including those in Sunfall and Visible Light

Anthologies 
 Altered States: a cyberpunk sci-fi anthology (2014) – "Mech" (1992)

Other works

As editor
The Merovingen Nights shared-world anthologies are set on the world of Merovin in Cherryh's Alliance–Union universe.  They are collections of interrelated short stories written by Cherryh and others.  Cherryh's novel Angel with the Sword precedes book #1 in this series.
Festival Moon (1987) – Merovingen Nights #1
Fever Season (1987) – Merovingen Nights #2
Troubled Waters (1988) – Merovingen Nights #3
Smuggler's Gold (1988) – Merovingen Nights #4
Divine Right (1989) – Merovingen Nights #5
Flood Tide (1990) – Merovingen Nights #6
Endgame (1991) – Merovingen Nights #7

As translator
From French to English:
The Green Gods (1980), by N. C. Henneberg (Nathalie and Charles Henneberg)
Stellar Crusade (1980), by Pierre Barbet
The Book of Shai (1982), by Daniel Walther
Shai's Destiny (1985), by Daniel Walther

Other credits

Cherryh did not write the three novels in the Sword of Knowledge series, but received co-author's credit because she penned a foreword to each.  The publisher removed Cherryh's introductions from most or all editions of these works.
 A Dirge for Sabis (1989), by Cherryh and Leslie Fish
 Wizard Spawn (1989), by Cherryh and Nancy Asire
 Reap the Whirlwind (1989), by Cherryh and Mercedes Lackey
The Sword of Knowledge (1995) – compilation of the three titles in a single volume

Scholarship
Works about C. J. Cherryh written by others.
 The Cherryh Odyssey (2004), by Edward Carmien – a collection of essays by academics, critics and authors about C. J. Cherryh

References

External links
Bibliography of C. J. Cherryh at the author's official site.
C. J. Cherryh: Bio and Bibliography at the author's official site.
Universes of C. J. Cherryh at the author's official site.
.
C. J. Cherryh at Fantastic Fiction.

C. J. Cherryh bibliography at SciFan.
Complete Bibliography of C. J. Cherryh (through 1995) at Meetpoint.

 
Bibliographies by writer
Bibliographies of American writers
Science fiction bibliographies
Fantasy bibliographies